The 1988 Soviet football championship was the 56th seasons of competitive football in the Soviet Union. Dnepr Dnepropetrovsk won the Top League championship becoming the Soviet domestic champions for the second time.

Honours

Notes = Number in parentheses is the times that club has won that honour. * indicates new record for competition

Soviet Union football championship

Top League

First League

Second League (finals)

Group 1

Group 2

Group 3

Top goalscorers

Top League
 Yevhen Shakhov (Dnepr Dnepropetrovsk), Aleksandr Borodyuk (Dinamo Moscow) – 16 goals

First League
Aleksandr Nikitin (Rotor Volgograd), Mukhsin Mukhamadiev (Pamir Dushanbe) – 22 goals

References

External links
 1988 Soviet football championship. RSSSF